KPJ Sabah Specialist Hospital is a private hospital in the city of Kota Kinabalu, Sabah, Malaysia. The hospital was built in 2012, and started operating in 2014 with a total of 245 beds.

See also 
 List of hospitals in Malaysia

References 

Hospital buildings completed in 2014
Hospitals in Sabah
Buildings and structures in Kota Kinabalu